The Democratic Union Party may refer to:
Democratic Union Party (Bukovina), Romanian political party
Democratic Union Party (Cuba), Cuban political party
Democratic Union Party (Egypt), Egyptian political party
Democratic Union Party (Greece), Greek political party
Democratic Union Party (Peru), Peruvian political party
Democratic Union Party (Syria), Syrian Kurdish political party
Democratic Union (Russia), Russian political party

See also
 Democratic Unionist Party (disambiguation)